The 2017 European Judo Championships were held in Warsaw, Poland from 20–23 April 2017.

Medal overview

Men

Women

Medal table

Participating nations
There was a total of 369 participants from 41 nations.

References

External links 
 Official website
 
 Results
 Team results

 
European Judo Championships
Judo, European Championships
European Championships
Judo, 2017 European Championships
Judo, 2017 European Championships
Judo competitions in Poland
Judo, European Championships